South Africa produces around  electricity annually.2015 est. Most of this electricity is consumed domestically, but around 12,000 gigawatt-hours are annually exported to Eswatini, Botswana, Mozambique, Lesotho, Namibia, Zambia, Zimbabwe and other Southern African Development Community countries participating in the Southern African Power Pool. South Africa supplements its electricity supply by importing around 9,000 GWh per year from the Cahora Bassa hydroelectric generation station in Mozambique via the 1,920 MW Cahora Bassa high-voltage direct current transmission system of which 1500 MW is sold to South Africa.

Most power stations in South Africa are owned and operated by Eskom. These plants account for 95% of all the electricity produced in South Africa and 45% of all electricity produced on the African continent.

In terms of share of GDP in 2012, South Africa was the 4th largest investor in renewable power in the world after Uruguay, Mauritius and Costa Rica.

The following is a list of electricity generating facilities within South Africa that are larger than 2 MW capacity. It contains currently operational facilities and facilities under construction.  As far as possible the net power output in megawatts is listed, i.e. the maximum power the power station can deliver to the grid.

For notable facilities that are not operating or have been decommissioned see List of decommissioned power stations in South Africa

Fossil Fuels

Coal fired 

South Africa is the seventh biggest coal producer in the world and has rich coal deposits concentrated in the north-east of the country and as such the majority of South Africa's coal-fired plants are located in the Mpumalanga province. Around 81% of South Africa's energy needs are directly derived from coal and 81% of all coal consumed domestically goes towards electricity production. Historically this has given South Africa access to cheap electricity, but it is also one of the leading reasons that the country is in the top 20 list of carbon dioxide emitting countries.

Open Cycle Gas Turbine (OCGT)

Low Carbon Power and Renewable Energy 
Department of Energy Data Portal - http://redis.energy.gov.za/power-producers/

Pumped Storage 

For a more complete list of hydro power stations from large to pico size, see the African hydropower database.

Hydroelectricity 

For a more complete list of hydro power stations from large to pico size, see the African hydropower database.

Nuclear 

The two reactors at Koeberg are (as of 2017) the only commercial nuclear power plants on the African continent and accounts for around 5% of South Africa's electricity production. Low and intermediate waste is disposed of at Vaalputs Radioactive Waste Disposal Facility in the Northern Cape.

Wind power 

Eskom constructed one small-scale prototype wind farm at Klipheuwel in the Western Cape and another demonstrator site is near Darling with phase 1 completed.

The South African Department of Energy allocated 634 MW of wind capacity in the Renewable Energy Independent Power Producer Procurement Programme – bid window 1.

In bid window 2, 562.5 MW capacity was allocated. In bid window 3, 787 MW were allocated. In bid window 4, 676 MW was awarded. In bid window 4 (additional), 687 MW was added.

Concentrated solar power 

Concentrated solar power uses molten salt energy storage in a tower or trough configurations.

The South African Department of Energy allocated 150 MW of concentrated solar power (CSP) capacity in the Renewable Energy Independent Power Producer Procurement Programme – bid window 1. In the Renewable Energy IPP Procurement Programme: window 2, a capacity of 50 MW was allocated In the Renewable Energy IPP Procurement Programme: window 3, a capacity of 200 MW was allocated. In an additional bid allocation, bid window 3.5, a further 200 MW was allocated.

Solar PV power 

The South African Department of Energy allocated 631.53 MW of solar photovoltaic (PV) capacity in the Renewable Energy Independent Power Producer Procurement Programme – bid window 1. In the Renewable Energy IPP Procurement Programme bid window 2, a capacity of 417.1 MW was allocated. In bid window 3, 435 MW was awarded. In bid window 4, 415 MW was awarded. In bid window 4(+), 398 MW was added.

Landfill gas power

Biomass power

See also 

 List of decommissioned power stations in South Africa
 Department of Energy (South Africa)
 Fossil-fuel power plant
 Renewable energy in Africa
 Energy in South Africa

References

External links 

 nersa.org.za/ – National Energy Regulator
 
 Energy Blog – Renewable Energy Power Plants Database

 
Power stations
South Africa